Geraldo Dutra Pereira (born 24 April 1963), commonly known as Geraldão, is a Brazilian former footballer who played as a centre-back.

Geraldão represented his country at the 1987 Copa América tournament.

Honours
FC Porto
Intercontinental Cup: 1987
European Super Cup: 1987

References

External links
 
 

1963 births
Living people
People from Governador Valadares
Brazilian footballers
Brazilian football managers
Association football defenders
Campeonato Brasileiro Série A players
Qatar Stars League players
Primeira Liga players
Ligue 1 players
Liga MX players
Brazil international footballers
1987 Copa América players
Expatriate footballers in Qatar
Brazilian expatriate sportspeople in Qatar
Expatriate footballers in Portugal
Brazilian expatriate sportspeople in Portugal
Expatriate footballers in France
Brazilian expatriate sportspeople in France
Expatriate footballers in Mexico
Brazilian expatriate sportspeople in Mexico
Cruzeiro Esporte Clube players
Al-Arabi SC (Qatar) players
FC Porto players
Paris Saint-Germain F.C. players
Club América footballers
Grêmio Foot-Ball Porto Alegrense players
Associação Portuguesa de Desportos players
Ipatinga Futebol Clube managers
Clube de Regatas Brasil managers
Esporte Clube Democrata managers
Pan American Games gold medalists for Brazil
Pan American Games medalists in football
Footballers at the 1987 Pan American Games
Medalists at the 1987 Pan American Games
Sportspeople from Minas Gerais